The  is a marine unit of the Japan Self-Defense Forces (JSDF) responsible for conducting amphibious operations.

The ARDB is based at Camp Ainoura in Sasebo, Nagasaki Prefecture.

History

In light of tensions over the Senkaku Islands and the decision for putting the Chinese Coast Guard under military control, Japan started the process of creating an elite marine unit. This brigade was designed to conduct amphibious operations and to recover any Japanese islands taken by an adversary.

In 2006, Japan devised a plan to respond to this threat as outlined in the Defense Programs and Budget of Japan. Thus Japan prepared an amphibious force with the necessary know-how, acquired amphibious and other vehicles for such warfare. Prior to this, training was conducted with the U.S. Marine Corps such as "Iron Fist" and the integrated exercise "Dawn Blitz" in which the JSDF participated.

In the Rim of the Pacific Exercise of 2014, the Japan Ground Self-Defense Force participated for the first time with amphibious warfare training between the U.S. Marine Corps and the GSDF for multilateral exercises. In Japan, joint exercises are also conducted by inviting the U.S. Marine Corps at JGSDF Camp Soumagahara (Gunma Prefecture) and training with the dispatch of GSDF members to the U.S. Marine Corps in Okinawa Prefecture.

In 2016, 300 WAIR soldiers were sent to Camp Pendleton for marine training. They were also trained to prepare for the ARDB's establishment.

On March 27, 2018, groundwork for the creation of the ARDB was completed.

On April 7, 2018, Japan activated its first marine unit since World War II. The marines of the Japanese Ground Self-Defense Force (JGSDF)'s Amphibious Rapid Deployment Brigade, gathered at a ceremony activating the brigade at JGSDF's Camp Ainoura in Sasebo. The Brigade is trained to counter invaders from occupying Japanese islands along the edge of the East China Sea that Tokyo considers vulnerable to attack.

150 ARDB soldiers were deployed for the first time in an overseas training exercise with American and Filipino marines in Operation Kamandag in October 2018. This was the first time that Japanese armored vehicles were on foreign soil since WW2. The marine unit also dispatched 300 soldiers to participate in Exercise Talisman Saber in July 2019, training in amphibious landings at Queensland, Australia along with Australian soldiers and American and British marines. The ARDB suffered its first casualty when a 38-year old JGSDF soldier, Suguru Maehara, with the rank of Sergeant 1st Class, was killed in a vehicular accident during joint exercises with US and Filipino troops on 7 October 2018. The vehicle he was riding in collided with another vehicle in Subic Bay.

On March 10, 2021, 55 recruits passed the training course for the ARDB, including two women. The two women, Sergeants First Class Azusa Unno and Misaki Hirata, had participated in the unit's 16th training session.

Future
The ARDB was reported to be set to establish a third regiment, to be located at Kyushu by fiscal year 2023. These "regiments" are battalion size units.

Organization

The ARDB is composed of the following:
 Brigade HQ
 1st Amphibious Rapid Deployment Regiment (Location in Camp Ainoura)
 2nd Amphibious Rapid Deployment Regiment (Location in Camp Ainoura)
 3rd Amphibious Rapid Deployment Regiment (being formed)
 Artillery Battalion
 Reconnaissance Battalion
 Engineer Battalion
 Combat Landing Battalion 
 Logistic Support Battalion
 Signal Company
 Amphibious Rapid Deployment Training Unit

Key executives

Equipment

Infantry weapons

ARDB forces are equipped with light infantry weapons, including:
Carl Gustaf 8.4cm recoilless rifle
Middle range Multi-Purpose missile
Hirtenberger M6C-210 Light mortar
L16 81mm mortar Medium mortar
M120 RT Heavy mortar
Minimi 5.56mm Light Machine guns
MAG 7.62mm Machine guns
Howa Type 20 Assault rifles
Howa Type 89 Assault rifles
M24 SWS Sniper Rifles
Minebea PM-9 Machine pistol

Vehicles
The ARDB is also equipped with US and Japanese-made military vehicles and aircraft such as:

Assault Amphibious Vehicle AAV7A1 RAM/RS
Bell Boeing V-22 Osprey MV-22B Tiltrotor aircraft
Combat Rubber Raiding Craft
Komatsu LAV
Mitsubishi Type 73 Light Truck
Toyota Type 73 Medium Truck

See also
 Amphibious Brigades (Imperial Japanese Army) — Historical army units
 Imperial Japanese Marines — Historical navy units

References

External links

Official website

Japan Ground Self-Defense Force Brigade
Japan Ground Self-Defense Force
Amphibious landing brigades
Military units and formations established in 2018
2018 establishments in Japan